Club Deportivo Numancia de Soria "B" is the reserve team of CD Numancia, sports club from Soria. The club is named after the ancient Celtiberian town of Numantia, near present-day Soria. Founded in 1979,  currently plays in Tercera División – Group 8, holding home games at Ciudad del Fútbol Francisco Rubio Garcés, with a 1,000-seat capacity.

Season to season
As Soria CF

As CD Numancia Promesas

As CD Numancia B

20 seasons in Tercera División
1 season in Tercera División RFEF

Current squad

Former players
 Binke Diabaté
 Diego de Miguel
 Luis Valcarce
 Pablo Valcarce
 César Vinuesa
 Pablo Sanz Martínez

References

External links
Official Numancia website  
Soccerway team profile

Football clubs in Castile and León
B
Association football clubs established in 1979
Spanish reserve football teams
1979 establishments in Spain
Sport in Soria